Alfred Albert Arraj (September 1, 1906 – October 23, 1992) was a United States district judge of the United States District Court for the District of Colorado.

Education and career

Born in Kansas City, Missouri, Arraj received a Bachelor of Laws from the University of Colorado Law School in 1928. He was in private practice in Denver, Colorado, from 1928 to 1929, in Springfield, Colorado, from 1929 to 1933, back in Denver from 1934 to 1936, and again in Springfield from 1936 to 1942. He was a major in the United States Army during World War II, from 1942 to 1946, thereafter returning to his Springfield practice until 1949. He was a District Judge of the 15th Judicial District of Colorado from 1949 to 1957.

Federal judicial service

On July 2, 1957, Arraj was nominated by President Dwight D. Eisenhower to a seat on the United States District Court for the District of Colorado vacated by Judge Jean Sala Breitenstein. Arraj was confirmed by the United States Senate on August 5, 1957, and received his commission on August 6, 1957. He served as Chief Judge from 1959 to 1976. He was a member of the Judicial Conference of the United States from 1964 to 1967, and a board member of the Federal Judicial Center from 1974 to 1976. He assumed senior status on August 31, 1976, and served in that capacity until his death on October 23, 1992, in Denver.

Honor

The federal courthouse in Denver is named after Arraj.

References

External links

 

1906 births
1992 deaths
Lawyers from Kansas City, Missouri
Colorado state court judges
Judges of the United States District Court for the District of Colorado
United States district court judges appointed by Dwight D. Eisenhower
20th-century American judges
United States Army personnel of World War II
United States Army officers
University of Colorado Law School alumni
20th-century American lawyers
People from Baca County, Colorado